Frank Varner (14 July 1937 – 26 June 2001) was a Norwegian businessman. He established the holding company Varner-Gruppen, which developed into the largest operator in the textile retailing trade in Norway.

Biography
He was born in Oslo to Petter Oskar Varner (1903–65)  and Solveig Kleve (1904–77).
In 1962, he established his first clothing store on Thorvald Meyersgate in Grünerløkka in Oslo.
In 1965, Varner opened two more stores in Oslo and Trondheim. 
In 1967 he founded the Dressmann chain of men's clothing stores.
In 1985 he entered women's clothing, with the launch of Carlings. 
In 1989, Varner acquired an owner's share of more than 90 percent in Jonas Øglænd AS.
This was followed by the purchase of Cubus (1989), Bik Bok (1991) and Vivikes (1994). In 1994 he also started the chain Varners.

Personal life
He settled in Asker. 
He married Turid Iversen in 1961. 
They were the parents of three sons.
He died in Oslo during 2001.

References

1937 births
2001 deaths
Businesspeople from Oslo
People from Asker
Norwegian company founders
Norwegian businesspeople in retailing